The 2011–12 A Group was the 88th season of the Bulgarian national top football division, and the 64th of A Group as the top tier football league in the country. The season began on 6 August 2011 and ended on 23 May 2012. Ludogorets Razgrad claimed their maiden title in their debut season, after winning the last round clash against CSKA, which were leading by 2 points prior to the match. Vidima-Rakovski, Kaliakra and Svetkavitsa were relegated, after finishing at the bottom three places.

Team information
Akademik Sofia and Sliven were directly relegated after finishing in the bottom two places of the table at the end of season 2010/11. Akademik were relegated after one year in the top league of Bulgarian football, while Sliven ended a three-year tenure at the top flight. Furthermore, Pirin (Blagoevgrad) were excluded from A Group due to financial difficulties and demoted to V Group.

The relegated teams were replaced by Botev Vratsa, champions of West B Group, Ludogorets Razgrad, champions of East B Group and promotion play-off winners Svetkavitsa. Botev Vratsa returned to A Group after twenty-two years, while Ludogorets Razgrad and Svetkavitsa both made their debut on the highest level of Bulgarian football.

There was some controversy regarding the relegation/promotion play-offs at the end of season 2010/11. In the original match-up, 14th-placed Vidima-Rakovski lost 3-0 against B Group play-off winners Chernomorets (Pomorie). However, Chernomorets did not receive an A Group licence, so Vidima-Rakovski were spared from relegation. In order to fill the void, a second play-off match was scheduled between Svetkavitsa, 4th-placed team of East B Group, and Etar (Veliko Tarnovo), 3rd-placed team of West B Group. Svetkavitsa won this match by a score of 3-1.

Stadia and locations
As in the previous year, the league comprises the best thirteen teams of season 2010-11, the champions of the two B Groups and the winners of the promotion play-offs.

Notes
 Lokomotiv Sofia play their home matches at Vasil Levski National Stadium as their own ground, Lokomotiv Stadium, had not received approval from the BFU license committee.

Personnel and sponsoring

Managerial changes

Note: Georgi Ivanov subsequently stepped down and was replaced by Yasen Petrov as caretaker manager at the helm of Levski, with Ilian Iliev set to take over prior to the 2012/2013 season.

League table

Results

Champions
Ludogorets Razgrad

Mihaylov, Travner, Grabus, Remzi, Atanasov, Dyulgerov and Kolev left the club during a season.

Season statistics

Top goalscorers
Below is a list of the top goalscorers at the end of the competition.

Scoring

First goal of the season: 19:08 – Georgi Bozhilov for Cherno More against Montana (6 August 2011)
Fastest goal of the season: 6 seconds – Miroslav Manolov (Cherno More) against Montana (22 March 2012)

Transfers
List of Bulgarian football transfers summer 2011
List of Bulgarian football transfers winter 2011–12

References

External links
Official website

First Professional Football League (Bulgaria) seasons
Bul
1